André Dang Van Nha (born Voh, New Caledonia, 27 July 1936) is a New Caledonian mining magnate, of Vietnamese origin and French/Australian/Vietnamese citizenship. He is best known for brokering a series of remarkable mining deals that also supported the Kanak cause for independence from France.

Background
André Dang was born in poverty to Nguyen Thi Binh, a Vietnamese woman who had left behind her three children in Phhuc Am in French Indochina, and was recruited as an indentured labourer by a mining company in 1935 to work on New Caledonia's nickel mines in and around the Koniambo complex, close to the town of Voh in the country's north. She was treated harshly like many of the Chân Dăng Vietnamese labourers imported to work the mines, and suffered greatly as one of few women. She met Dang Van Nha at the camp and André Dang was their child. Dang Van Nha died in an industrial accident in 1937 while constructing a wharf. Because they were not married, indeed married to others in Vietnam, Thi Binh received none of his pension, and was posted to even harsher labour on a chrome mine near Koumac where her son was cared for by other Vietnamese as she worked long days.  This was unsustainable, and André Dang was then adopted by a Vietnamese couple of modest means and living in Nouméa. He gradually integrated into the predominant French culture of the city. At the age of 6, US Marines arrived in Nouméa after a major Pacific base was established by the Allies, and Dang was in frequent contact with them and learned English. He attended Sacré Cœur and then Frédéric Surleu public schools. In 1949 his mother finished her contract on the mines, moved to Nouméa,  and he returned to live with her along with two new siblings. Working as a mechanic, he married Bui Thi En at the age of 18 and gained a diploma and a job at the Doniambo nickel smelter. They had 4 children. He was supported to undertake a degree in engineering in Marseilles in the late 1950s, where he also took French citizenship.

Business activities
In 1961 Dang returned to Nouméa to co-manage first a Citroën dealership, and then met great success with his own Toyota import business and petrol station. He suffered racism in his business affairs, particularly in the 1960s, in a city populated largely by Europeans protecting their monopoly, and particularly hostile to Vietnamese, three quarters of whom left New Caledonia in that decade to return to Vietnam during its war. In the 1970s he met and became friends with Jean-Marie Tjibaou, a Kanak leader and supporter of independence from France. Increasingly aligned with, but not a participant in, independence struggles in the 1980s, he was forced into exile in Australia after being falsely accused of financial support for the independence movement. His petrol station was torched during les Evénements, while he was away on business in Sydney and he remained there living in Kellyville, NSW and setting up several new businesses, becoming an Australian citizen. After the signing of the Accords de Matignon in 1988 he returned, and took on the Directorship of SMSP (Société minière du sud Pacifique), which had recently been sold by Jacques Lafleur to the Kanak-controlled SOFINOR operation as a gesture of political reconciliation.

He was successful in turning around this bankrupt company, and by 1995, the SMSP had become a prime nickel exporter. In 2008 they opened a nickel smelter in South Korea and a series of deals led by Dang enabled construction of another, the huge Koniambo massif project where he had begun his life. The brokering of this deal by Dang and others in the ‘Bercy Agreements’ of 1998 was legendary in New Caledonia, involving a swap of mining titles with other nickel mines, political interventions, and clever bargaining to provide the Kanak north of the island with its own economic powerhouse and employment opportunity. The US$5.3 billion plant at Vavouto is operated by Koniambo Nickel SAS (KNS), a joint venture between the Northern Province’s SMSP and the transnational conglomerate Glencore-Xstrata.The Koniambo mine and smelter, a multibillion-dollar operation, entered production in 2014. Dang, now in his late 70s, is President and CEO of SMSP, and strongly protective of New Caledonian ownership in its mining interests.

Dang is regarded as a somewhat mysterious figure in New Caledonia, and a biography published in 2008, Mystère Dang, sheds some light on his rags-to-riches story and political leanings.

References

1936 births
Living people
Australian people of Vietnamese descent
Australian businesspeople
French people of Vietnamese descent
French businesspeople
New Caledonian people of Vietnamese descent
Vietnamese businesspeople
People from North Province, New Caledonia